The mixed team normal hill took place on 24 February 2013.

Results
The final was held at 17:00.

References

FIS Nordic World Ski Championships 2013